Tamworth Airport  is a regional airport serving Tamworth, a city in the Australian state of New South Wales. It is also known as Tamworth Regional Airport.

Tamworth Airport is the northern base of the Hunter Region Westpac Life Saver Rescue Helicopter Service and the location for IFTT Flight Training College, and CAE Oxford Aviation Academy Tamworth

History 
No. 6 Elementary Flying Training School of the Royal Australian Air Force was formed in 1940, during the Second World War, at the original airfield (located in what is now the Taminda industrial area) as part of the Empire Air Training Scheme. Training included 50 hours of basic aviation instruction on a simple trainer like the Tiger Moth. Pilots who showed promise went on to advanced training at a Service Flying Training School. Others went on to different specialties, such as Wireless Schools, Air Observer Schools or Bombing and Gunnery Schools. The RAAF airfield went on to become the original home of East West Airlines after WW2.

In 1951 a decision was taken to relocate the aerodrome with the council commencing construction in 1952 and the official opening of the new airport in 1956. The airport received a further upgrade to medium jet standard in 1982. The addition of the  parallel runway and associated facility expansion was undertaken between 1990 and 1993 as part of the establishment of the British Aerospace/Ansett pilot training joint venture which has evolved into the Bae systems college. Bae systems withdrew from Tamworth Airport in 2020 and the college facilities were re-branded as International Flight Training Tamworth (IFTT), under the ownership of Tamworth Regional Council, with CAE Oxford Aviation Academy Tamworth remaining on site.

The Tamworth Airport terminal expansion was completed in June 2012, to facilitate the commencement of passenger screening. A further expansion was carried out in 2014 to accommodate operations by additional carriers.

During the 2020 COVID-19 Pandemic the Flight training school, was converted into accommodation for the Local boarding school Farrer Memorial Agricultural High School to comply with social distancing regulations

In February 2022, Bonza announced that the airport would become one of its 17 destinations with the airline planning to fly to the Sunshine Coast and Melbourne from Tamworth

Facilities 
The latest terminal upgrade was completed in 2019 with an enlarged departure lounge, new cafe and hire car facilities, relocated and enlarged Qantas lounge in addition to a multipurpose function room and airport administration office.

Airlines and destinations

Statistics 
Tamworth Airport was ranked 39th in Australia for the number of revenue passengers served in financial year 2010–2011.

See also 
 List of airports in New South Wales

References 

Airports in New South Wales
Buildings and structures in Tamworth, New South Wales
Former Royal Australian Air Force bases
Airports established in 1956